The women's 400 metres event at the 2002 Commonwealth Games was held on 26–28 July.

Medalists

Results

Heats
Qualification: First 4 of each heat (Q) and the next 4 fastest (q) qualified for the quarterfinals.

Quarterfinals
Qualification: First 4 of each heat (Q) and the next 4 fastest qualified for the semifinals.

Semifinals
Qualification: First 4 of each heat qualified directly (Q) for the final.

Final

References
Official results
Results at BBC

400
2002
2002 in women's athletics